Vladimír Bouzek (3 December 1920 – 31 July 2006) was an ice hockey player who played in the Czechoslovak First Ice Hockey League.  He won a silver medal at the 1948 Winter Olympics.  He was inducted into the International Ice Hockey Federation Hall of Fame in 2007. He also played football as a forward, and made three appearances for the Czechoslovakia national team between 1950 and 1951.

References

External links
 

1920 births
2006 deaths
Czech ice hockey centres
Czechoslovak ice hockey centres
Czechoslovakia men's national ice hockey team coaches
Ice hockey players at the 1948 Winter Olympics
IIHF Hall of Fame inductees
Medalists at the 1948 Winter Olympics
Olympic ice hockey players of Czechoslovakia
Olympic medalists in ice hockey
Olympic silver medalists for Czechoslovakia
Sportspeople from Třebíč
Czech footballers
Czechoslovak footballers
Czechoslovakia international footballers
Association football forwards